Kaboses Radio 103.1 (DYTG 103.1 MHz) is an FM station owned by Tagbilaran Broadcasting System and operated by Prime Media Services. Its studios and transmitter are located at the Ground Floor, Residencia Marfel, #23 Lukban St., Tacloban. It is an affiliate station of Radyo5 in Manila, airing the latter's flagship program Ted Failon at DJ Chacha sa Radyo5.

The frequency was formerly occupied by Dream Radio from 2016 to the end of 2022, when it swapped frequencies with sister station Kaboses Radio.

References

External links
Kaboses Radio FB Page

Radio stations in Tacloban
Radio stations established in 2016